Son of Geronimo  is a 1952 American Western Serial film directed by Spencer Gordon Bennet and starring Clayton Moore.

Plot
Jim Scott attempts to bring peace between west-bound settlers and native Apaches. This task is made harder by a band of local outlaws.

Cast
 Clayton Moore as Jim Scott (as Clay Moore)
 Bud Osborne as Tulsa
 Tommy Farrell as Frank Baker
 Rodd Redwing as Portico, Son of Geronimo
 Marshall Reed as Rance Rankin
 Eileen Rowe as Ann Baker
 John Crawford as Ace Devlin [Chs.1-9]
 Zon Murray as Henchman Bat
 Rick Vallin as Henchman Eadie
 Lyle Talbot as Col. Foster [Chs.5-6]
 Chief Yowlachie as Geronimo [ch 15]

Chapter titles
 War of Vengeance
 Running the Gauntlet
 Stampede
 Apache Allies
 Indian Ambush
 Trapped by Fire
 A Sinister Scheme
 Prisoners of Porico
 On the Warpath
 The Fight at Crystal Springs
 A Midnight Marauder
 Trapped in a Flaming Teepee
 Jim Scott Tempts Fate
 A Trap for Geronimo
 Peace Treaty
Source:

See also
List of film serials by year
List of film serials by studio

References

External links

Son of Geronimo at Cinefania.com

1952 films
American Western (genre) films
American black-and-white films
Columbia Pictures film serials
1950s English-language films
Films directed by Spencer Gordon Bennet
1952 Western (genre) films
Films about Native Americans
Films with screenplays by George H. Plympton
1950s American films